The Couch is a 1962 American psychological horror film directed by Owen Crump from a screenplay by Robert Bloch and a story by Blake Edwards and Owen Crump. The film stars Grant Williams, Shirley Knight, and Onslow Stevens. The film was released by Warner Bros. on February 21, 1962.

Plot
A man phones the police and announces that a murder will be committed at seven o'clock. At the stroke of 7:00 p.m., he stabs a stranger on the streets with an icepick; escaping, he then reports to Dr. Janz for his daily psychiatric session. Although it is after 7:00, the young man tells the waiting receptionist, Terry, that it is exactly 7:00 – she has mislaid her watch and is unaware of the exact time. He returns the icepick to the bar in the practice, from where he had taken it.

The man is revealed to be Charles Campbell, who has been paroled following a two-year prison term for rape on condition that he undergo daily psychiatric treatment. While for the most part maintaining a calm demeanour, he always approaches the analyst's couch with trepidation and occasionally becomes aggressive and shows signs of inner turmoil during sessions. Beyond being Janz's patient, he is carrying on a romantic relationship with Terry, who is also Janz's niece. As fraternization with patients is not permitted, they keep their relationship clandestine. On a walk together one night, Charles tells Terry, who is not privy to patient histories, that he is seeing Dr. Janz as a condition of parole following a manslaughter conviction in the death of his dear sister, Ruthie, and that he is tormented with guilt for being at the wheel in the car accident that claimed her life.
 
Several days after the first murder, he commits another murder in the same manner, again announcing this in advance to the police. This sets off a cat-and-mouse game between the police and the murderer, but all attempts to track him down fail. The murders become daily fodder for the press. It is revealed that Campell had in fact stolen Terry's watch, enabling him to mislead her about the time. By telling Dr. Janz that he had been in the waiting room longer than he in fact had after committing the second murder, Charles has created alibis for himself for the times of the two murders; seemingly being at the practice at 7:00 on the nights in question, he cannot be what headlines have dubbed the "7:00 Killer." In another session when Charles makes mention of his deceased mother and wanting to kill his father, Dr. Janz confronts his delusion that his father is alive and his sister Ruthie is dead: in fact, his father is already dead, and his sister is alive, "dead" to him because her marriage and relocation represented the death of the love from an ersatz mother.

Charles's next victim is Dr. Janz himself, who has become suspicious of him and the significance of 7:00 in the killings. After stabbing the doctor in a crowded passageway at a football stadium, Charles goes to Janz's office to meet Terry. The meeting had been arranged by the two in order to reveal their relationship and plans to marry to Dr. Janz; as Charles had falsely told her that Dr. Janz said he could discontinue treatment at any time, she believes there is no obstacle to their being together. Charles also lies to her that he has come from another meeting confirming a large inheritance, telling her he is now free to do anything. Terry asks him what he means, but Charles does not reveal more and instead attempts to seduce her. While she is trying to repel him, they are interrupted by a phone call notifying Terry that her uncle, following a stabbing, is alive but unconscious in a hospital. She and Charles race there and are told Janz is expected to recover, but that surgery must be performed. They become separated, and Terry learns from the investigators that a handbill found in her car reveals the car was in the area of the football match where Dr. Janz was stabbed. As Terry had lent her car to Charles just prior to the match, only he can have driven it there and received the handbill.

Charles meanwhile explores the hospital, his identity concealed by an operating gown and mask taken from a supply room. After an unsuccessful attempt at killing Janz on the operating table, he enters the recovery room in which Dr. Janz is lying. When he has taken Dr. Janz on a gurney to a deserted area of the hospital, intending to kill him, he reveals to Janz that the other murders where simply to throw the police off the track so that he would not be suspected; the primary intended victim had always been Dr. Janz, who represents all father-like authority and whom Charles has confused with his hated father. Before the deranged killer can complete his third murder, however, he is apprehended by the police in the presence of Terry, who sees Charles for the deeply disturbed man he truly is.

Cast
Grant Williams as Charles Campbell
Shirley Knight as Terry Ames
Onslow Stevens as Dr. Janz
William Leslie as Dr. David Lindsay
Anne Helm as Jean Quimby
Simon Scott as Lt. Kritzman
Michael Bachus as Sgt. Bonner
John Alvin as Sloan
Harry Holcombe as District Attorney
Hope Summers as Mrs. Quimby

Notes
Three of the performers in this film appeared in multiple episodes of The Andy Griffith Show: Hope Summers (playing Clara Edwards in 32 episodes, 1961–1968, as well as five episodes in the series' follow-up Mayberry, R.F.D., 1968–1970), Hal Smith (Otis Campbell, 32 episodes,1960-1966, as well as appearing in the follow-up film Return to Mayberry, 1986) and Ronnie (a.k.a. Ronny) Dapo (Arnold Winkler/Pete, three episodes, 1963–1966). The latter two performers (playing the pitchman and a boy watching the pitchman, respectively) were uncredited in the film.

See also
 List of American films of 1962

References

External links
 
 

1962 films
1962 horror films
1960s serial killer films
American psychological horror films
American black-and-white films
1960s English-language films
Films set in Los Angeles
American serial killer films
Warner Bros. films
Films with screenplays by Robert Bloch
1960s American films